Islam Issa is a British scholar and author, a Lecturer in the School of English at Birmingham City University whose research has specialized in Early Modern English literature and the reception of Renaissance.

He is also a frequent broadcaster on the BBC and overseas, and has been described by The Guardian as a football analyst and players’ agent.

Career 
Issa graduated as a Doctor of Philosophy in English Literature from the University of Birmingham, where he was then a Visiting Lecturer and Fellow until he became a lecturer at the Birmingham City University in 2015. He teaches all periods and genres of English literature, and his research has focused on Early Modern English literature and the present-day reception of the Renaissance. His other academic interests include literary translation, censorship and cultural history.

Issa has a media presence, with appearances on over forty radio and television stations around the world. He has also given public lectures overseas, including work for the British Foreign Office. In 2017, the BBC identified his as one of its New Generation Thinkers, one of ten academics whose research was to be made into radio and television programmes. In 2012, according to The Observer, Issa disclosed that two Egyptian soccer stars believed that the Port Said Stadium riot had been planned.

In 2016, Issa published research into the First World War which stated that “at least 885,000 Muslims were recruited by the Allies”, with the Discovery Channel noting that “Issa more than doubled the previously estimated figure of 400,000 soldiers after trawling through thousands of personal letters, historic archives, regimental diaries and census reports”. The findings came as he was curating the “first exhibition devoted to the Islamic contribution to World War I”. The exhibition was visited and praised by Charles, Prince of Wales.

In 2019, Issa presented the BBC Four television documentary Cleopatra and Me: In Search of a Lost Queen.

Awards and nominations 
Issa's book Milton in the Arab-Muslim World won the Outstanding First Book award of the Milton Society of America. He has also been named as Birmingham City University's Researcher of the Year. Issa won the Research Project of the Year at the Times Higher Education awards.

He was a finalist for Excellence in Community Relations at The Muslim News Awards and Services to Education at British Muslim Awards. His exhibition "Stories of Sacrifice", won the Muslim News Awards Excellence in Community Relations prize.

Publications 
 Milton in the Arab-Muslim World (2016).

References 

British writers
Academics of Birmingham City University
Living people
Year of birth missing (living people)